José Antonio Soto Délano (born January 28, 1986 in Valparaíso, Chile) is a former Chilean footballer who played for Santiago Wanderers, Deportes Concepción, Unión La Calera and Unión Quilpué in Chile.

Teams
  Santiago Wanderers 2001–2003
  Unión La Calera 2004
  Santiago Wanderers 2004–2007
  Unión Quilpué 2007
  Deportes Concepción 2008
  Santiago Wanderers 2008
  Unión Quilpué 2009

Personal life
He is the nephew of the former Chile international footballer Joel Soto, who also played for Santiago Wanderers.

Titles
  Santiago Wanderers 2001 (Chilean Primera División Championship)

References

External links
 Profile at BDFA 

1986 births
Living people
Sportspeople from Valparaíso
Chilean footballers
Santiago Wanderers footballers
Unión La Calera footballers
Unión Quilpué footballers
Deportes Concepción (Chile) footballers
Chilean Primera División players
Primera B de Chile players
Tercera División de Chile players
Association footballers not categorized by position